is an autobahn in Germany.

The A 559 is a former alignment of the A 59. The A 59 was rerouted in the 1980s to relieve congestion at the Gremberg four-way interchange with the A 4.

The primary function of the A 559, besides relieving traffic at the A 4 interchange, is to connect the Cologne-Bonn Airport to Cologne proper. The airport is along the A 59, one junction south of the A 559's southern terminus.

The section of road from the junction Köln-Vingst (just after the A 4) to the end of the freeway at Köln-Deutz is up to autobahn standards, but is only designated as the L 124. This stretch of road was signed at one time as the A 559, although the autobahn designation never officially covered the entire freeway.

Exit list

 Road continues as the L 111 into Köln

|-
| 
| style="text-align:right; padding:0 .5em;" | (1)
| 4-way interchange Gremberg 
 

|}

External links
 Autobahn Atlas: A559


559